"It's in the Rain" is the second European single released by Enya from her 2005 album Amarantine. It was released in some European countries in the first half of 2006.

In others, including the UK and Ireland, the single was released in November 2006, to promote the re-issue of the Amarantine album. This edition had a different single cover and was a double A-side with the traditional carol Adeste Fideles. Enya performed the song at the 2006 World Music Awards.

Track listing
Early 2006 release
"It's in the Rain (radio edit)"
"A Moment Lost"
"Drifting"

November 2006 release
"It's in the Rain"
"Adeste Fideles"

Charts

References

External links
Video

Enya songs
2006 singles
Music videos directed by Tim Royes